Baek Su-ho (born Baek Seung-hwan on April 17, 1998) is a South Korean actor. He began his career as a child actor.

Filmography

Films

Television series

Notes

Music videos

Awards and nominations

References

External links 
 
 
 

1998 births
Living people
South Korean male film actors
South Korean male television actors
South Korean male child actors